Charles Morland Agnew OBE (14 December 1855 – 23 May 1931) was a British art dealer and philanthropist.

Early life
He was the second son of William Agnew and his wife Mary née Kenworthy. He was educated at Rugby School before he matriculated to Trinity College, Cambridge, in 1874. He began playing rugby union at Rugby School and was deemed good enough to play for Cambridge University, winning two sporting 'Blues' by playing in the Varsity Match in both 1875 and 1876. His brothers George and Walter also represented Cambridge University at rugby. Agnew gained his BA in 1879 and was awarded his Master of the Arts in 1883.

Later life and philanthropy
During the First World War, Agnew worked for the Red Cross Society in the Wounded and Missing Department, and in 1918 he was invested as an Officer of the Order of the British Empire. In 1921, Agnew funded the building of the Evelyn Nursing Home on land owned by Trinity College, Cambridge. The hospital cost £27,000 to build and was donated as a thank-offering after a successful operation on his wife. The hospital is now under the ownership of Nuffield Health. In 1930 Agnew was awarded the role of High Sheriff of Hertfordshire.

Personal life
In 1881 he married Evelyn Mary Naylor, daughter of William Naylor. They had six children, their youngest became Vice-Admiral Sir William Gladstone Agnew.

Charles Gerald Agnew (b. 1882), father of Sir Geoffrey Agnew
Emily Margaret Agnew (1884–1941)
Lt.-Col. Kenneth Morland Agnew, DSO, MC, OBE (1886–1951)
Major Alan Graeme Agnew (1887–1962)
Commander Hugh Ladas Agnew (1894–1975)
Vice-Admiral Sir William Gladstone Agnew (1898–1960)

He died on 23 May 1931 at Croxley Green. Evelyn died a year later and their ashes were scattered on the grounds of the Evelyn Nursing Hospital.

References

1855 births
1931 deaths
Charles Morland
People educated at Rugby School
Alumni of St John's College, Cambridge
High Sheriffs of Hertfordshire
Cambridge University R.U.F.C. players
Officers of the Order of the British Empire
Younger sons of baronets